Américo Esporte Clube, commonly known as Américo, was a Brazilian football club based in Américo Brasiliense, São Paulo state.

History
The club was founded on September 25, 2007, by the businessman Celso Ferreira de Moura, and professionalized its football department in 2008, competing for the first time in a professional competition in the 2008 Campeonato Paulista Segunda Divisão, when they were eliminated in the Third Stage (Semifinals) of the competition.

Competition records

Stadium
Américo Esporte Clube played their home games at Estádio Municipal Joaquim Justo. The stadium has a maximum capacity of 5,000 people.

References

Association football clubs established in 2007
Defunct football clubs in São Paulo (state)
2007 establishments in Brazil